Mikołaj Ostroróg (1593–1651) was a Polish–Lithuanian szlachcic (nobleman), politician and general.

He was Podstoli of the Crown since 1633, Stolnik of the Crown since 1624, Krajczy of the Crown since 1636, Podczaszy of the Crown since 1638, Starost of Tykocin since 1645 and buski since 1646.

He served as the Sejm Marshal in the 1633. Deputy to a number of Sejms, he supported the policies of the administration, and was well known for his erudition in Polish and Latin.

In his military career, he reached the rank of regimentarz. He took part in the losing battle of Pyliavtsi in 1648 during the Khmelnytsky Uprising. Later, in 1649, he fought at the siege of Zbaraż.

Marshal of the Sejm (koronacyjny) on 8 February – 17 March 1633 in Kraków.

References

Military personnel of the Polish–Lithuanian Commonwealth
1593 births
1651 deaths
Members of the Sejm of the Polish–Lithuanian Commonwealth
Mikolaj
People from Tykocin
Polish military personnel of the Khmelnytsky Uprising